Suomen Sisu (Translated: Finnish Sisu) is a Finnish far-right association that defines itself as nationalist and patriotic, criticizing unlimited immigration and multiculturalism. Suomen Sisu proclaims to support the idea of independent national states, that govern themselves sovereignly, and opposes supranational co-operation, especially the European Union. Suomen Sisu was established as the Youth Organisation of the Association of Finnish Culture and Identity (Suomalaisuuden Liitto) in 1998, but this affiliation was broken in 2000. The organization is not affiliated with any political party, but its members have operated in several parties as individuals.

The association gained publicity in the spring of 2006 when it published the Muhammad-cartoons on its web site. Member of Parliament Jari Vilén asked the police to investigate the issue, but it did not lead to prosecution. Finnish Prime Minister Matti Vanhanen publicly apologised for the publication of the cartoons, which was interpreted by Suomen Sisu as "flattering the islamists".

Suomen Sisu was described as a "Nazi spirited" group by the Finnish newspaper Länsiväylä; the association's president deemed the description incorrect and filed a complaint with the Council for Mass Media in Finland. The Council ruled that as the Länsiväylä had given the president of the association an opportunity to publish his own letter regarding the issue in the Länsiväylä, the Council saw no need for further action. Suomen Sisu was founded by the members of a group called "Thule Society". The website of Suomen Sisu has promoted books by Nazis and neo-Nazis such as Alfred Rosenberg, George Lincoln Rockwell and David Duke.

Suomen Sisu congratulated its members Jussi Halla-aho, Olli Immonen, James Hirvisaari and Juho Eerola for having been elected as the members of the parliament of Finland, 17 April 2011 in general elections.

References

External links
Homepage 

Nationalist organizations
Finnish nationalism
1998 establishments in Finland
Neo-Nazism in Finland